Two by-elections were held in 1961. The first by-election, for the Hong Lim constituency, was held on 29 April with the nomination day held on 11 March, while the second by-election, for the Anson constituency, was held on 15 July with the nomination day held on 10 June.

April 1961 by-election in Hong Lim
Former PAP minister Ong Eng Guan resigned his seat in Hong Lim, filing the famous "16 resolutions" in the Legislative Assembly against the government and challenged the PAP to defeat him there after his sacking from the Cabinet. Shortly after, he was expelled by the party after making open disputes with his Cabinet colleagues, including over the abolishment of the City Council when he was the last Mayor. Two other PAP members had followed him to join his faction and resigned from the party but did not resign their seats with Ong.

Ong's landslide victory was attributed to his popularity with Hong Lim voters and his oratory skills. PAP candidate Jek Yeun Thong was Ong's secretary during his time as Mayor in the City Council.

July 1961 by-election in Anson
It was held to elect a new assembly member after the death of the incumbent PAP member Baharuddin Mohammed Ariff in the constituency of Anson.

As both Ismail from Liberal Socialist Party and Ibrahim from Singapore Congress have failed to secure the minimum 12.5% of the votes, both had their deposits forfeited.

Historical significance 
The victory of former Labour Front chief minister David Marshall, now Workers' Party (WP) leader, symbolised WP's first presence in the legislature.

At the same time, Ong Eng Guan mustered the two former PAP assembly members who resigned with him to form the United People's Party while independent Assembly Speaker A. P. Rajah joined the newly formed Singapore Alliance - an alliance of SPA, UMNO, MCA and MIC. Hence, for the first time since, there were no independent legislators.

Aftermath
Two days after the Anson result, Prime Minister Lee Kuan Yew assumed full responsibility for the two election setbacks and resigned as prime minister to PAP chairman Toh Chin Chye, only for Toh to reject it. 

Lee then moved a motion of confidence in his own government five days after the Anson by-election. The motion was agreed to with 27 "Ayes", 8 "Noes" and 16 abstentions. The members who voted "No" included David Marshall and members of the Singapore People's Alliance. 13 allegedly pro-communist PAP members and 3 members of Ong Eng Guan's UPP abstained.

Lee's view was that the PAP members who did not vote for his motion would be expelled for breaking ranks and pulling support away to Communist opponents and he did so, sacking the 13 AMs and reducing his assembly majority to 1.

The sacked members formed the far left Barisan Sosialis (BS) with a large number of PAP branches crossing the floor to join BS. BS would pose a strong challenge against the PAP in the 1963 election, but the PAP was re-elected to a second term in office.

David Marshall lost his seat of Anson in the 1963 general election contesting as an independent with the PAP regaining the seat. Anson would remain in PAP hands until 1981 when Workers' Party leader Joshua Benjamin Jeyaretnam won the seat.

Ong Eng Guan retained his seat in the 1963 election serving as AM for Hong Lim until his retirement from politics in 1965.

Electoral results

References
Background of the first (April) 1961 By election
Background of the second (July) 1961 By election
First (April) 1961 By Election's result
Second (July) 1961 By Election's result

1961
Singapore
1961 in Singapore
April 1961 events in Asia
July 1961 events in Asia